Heterogymna gyritis is a moth in the family Carposinidae. It was described by Edward Meyrick in 1910. It is found in Malacca in Malaysia.

References

Carposinidae
Moths described in 1910